Vilander is a surname. Notable people with the surname include:

 Jukka Vilander (born 1962), Finnish ice hockey player
 Toni Vilander (born 1980), Finnish race car driver

See also
Wilander

Finnish-language surnames